Is a Japanese government agency. It is a collegial administrative committee established under the jurisdiction of the Prime Minister as an external bureau of the Cabinet Office.

JCRC was established on January 7, 2020.

Internal organization 

 Casino Regulatory Commissio
 Chairman (appointed by the Prime Minister with Consent of National Diet. Salary is equivalent to Parliamentary Secretary)
 Committee members (4 members, 2 of whom are part-time. Both are appointed by the Prime Minister with the consent of both Houses.)
 Secretariat
 executive director
 Deputy Secretary General
 Inspector General
 General Affairs Planning Department
 General Affairs Division
 Dependence Countermeasures Division
 Planning Division
 Official Document Manager
 Supervisory Investigation Department
 Investigation Division
 Regulatory Supervision Division
 Financial Supervision Division

See also 

 Ministries of Japan

References 

 Japan’s Casino Regulatory Commission releases draft casino regulations, launches public consultation period
 Japan's Casino Regulatory Commission holds its first meeting amid bribery scandal
Japan’s casino commission to be fair, neutral: chairman
Japan casino regulator sets clear path forward

External links 

 Official website 

Government agencies of Japan
Government agencies established in 2020